Pervomaysky is a rural locality (a khutor) in Saltynskoye Rural Settlement, Uryupinsky District, Volgograd Oblast, Russia. The population was 711 as of 2010. There are 20 streets.

Geography 
Pervomaysky is located in forest steppe, 44 km northwest of Uryupinsk (the district's administrative centre) by road. Saltynsky is the nearest rural locality.

References 

Rural localities in Uryupinsky District